Hannah Diamond (born 17 October 2003) is an English netball player.  She was named as part of the Wasps Netball squad for the 2023 Netball Superleague season.

Early life
She attended The Blue Coat School, Oldham where she was Head Girl  and captain of the school netball team, which won the England Netball U19 2021/22 National Schools Finals.

References

Living people
2003 births
English netball players
Netball Superleague players
Wasps Netball players
People from Oldham